Dumaria may refer to one of the following villages in India:

 Dumaria, Chandauli district, in Uttar Pradesh state
 Dumaria, Gaya district, in Bihar state
 Dumaria block, a community development block in Jharkhand, India
 Dumaria, Purvi Singhbhum, a village in Jharkhand, India